Balls Cross is a hamlet in Ebernoe civil parish in the Chichester District of West Sussex, England.

The hamlet comprises a few houses together with a small garage and a pub, The Stag Inn at the junction of the road to Northchapel with the road from Petworth to Kirdford. Not far to the north, fields at Butcherlands Farm have been purchased by the Sussex Wildlife Trust which will be allowed to revert to pasture woodland over many years to double the size of the nationally important Ebernoe Common nature reserve.

External links

References 

Villages in West Sussex